Ring is the fifth studio album by the American alternative rock band the Connells, released in 1993.

The album (and band)'s biggest hit was the single "'74–'75", which reached the top ten in 11 European countries, peaking at No. 1 in Norway and Sweden, and appeared on the soundtrack of the 1995 film Heavy. In the UK, the album reached number 36 on the UK Albums Chart while "'74-'75" peaked at number 14 on the UK Singles Chart. In the US, the album reached number 199 on the Billboard 200 with the single "Slackjawed" reaching number nine on Billboard's Alternative Songs chart.

Critical reception
Trouser Press wrote: "The record contains some brilliant pieces of pop songcraft ('Carry My Picture,' 'Eyes on the Ground') and some bittersweet lyrical ruminations, but slower numbers like '’74-’75' are so sweet they border on cloying."

Track listing

Personnel
The Connells
Doug MacMillan - lead vocals, guitar
Mike Connell - guitar, vocals, lead vocals on "Spiral" and "Burden" 
George Huntley - guitar, mandolin, vocals, lead vocals on "Doin' You"
Steve Potak - piano, keyboards, organ 
David Connell - bass
Peele Wimberley - drums, percussion

Additional personnel
Tim Harper - keyboards, background vocals
Caro Giordano - cello

Technical personnel
Lou Giordano - producer, mixing, engineer
Tom Bender - engineer
Kate Broudy - engineer 
Dave Cook - engineer
Dan McLoughlin - engineer
John Yates - engineer

Charts

Weekly charts

Year-end charts

References

1993 albums
The Connells albums
TVT Records albums